Jill Witmer (born October 1, 1991) is an American field hockey player. Witmer was named to the U.S. National Team in 2013 and was named to the U.S. Olympic Team in 2016.

Early life
Witmer was born on October 1, 1991 to parents Lew and Judy Witmer. Witmer grew up in Lancaster, Pennsylvania with four siblings. She began playing field hockey at the urging of her parents. The Witmer family had built a gym for field hockey on their farm, nicknamed "the Coop." Witmer joined her first field hockey team in eighth grade. She then played for the local high school field hockey team Penn Manor even though she was home schooled. The Penn Manor team won the state championship Jill's junior year of high school.

College player
Witmer attended the University of Maryland where she played field hockey from 2010 to 2013. During her time at Maryland, the team won two national titles, in 2010 and 2011. Witmer was personally honored as a four-time NFHCA All-American and the 2013 ACC Player of the year. Witmer is among the highest scorers in the school's history, as of 2016 she is No. 4 in points with 163 and is No. 5 in goals at 67.

U.S. National Team
Witmer was named to the U.S. National Field Hockey team in the summer of 2013 while still a student at University of Maryland. Shortly after signing with the team, Witmer signed a sponsorship deal with STX, a sporting good company that sells field hockey equipment. She was part of the 2016 U.S. National Field Hockey team when the team placed third at the Champion's Trophy in London. She was then named to the U.S. Olympic team for the 2016 Rio de Janeiro Olympic games.

References

External links
 
Jill Witmer at Team USA

1991 births
Living people
American female field hockey players
Pennsylvanian (geology)
Maryland Terrapins field hockey players
Field hockey players at the 2016 Summer Olympics
Olympic field hockey players of the United States
Sportspeople from Lancaster, Pennsylvania
Female field hockey forwards
Pan American Games medalists in field hockey
Pan American Games gold medalists for the United States
Field hockey players at the 2015 Pan American Games
Medalists at the 2015 Pan American Games